Drescoma is a genus of snout moths. It was described by Harrison Gray Dyar Jr. in 1914 and is known from Panama.

Species
 Drescoma cinilixa Dyar, 1914
 Drescoma cyrdipsa Dyar, 1914

References

Phycitinae